The TCRC Division 105 Locomotive Engineers is a local union of the Teamsters Canada Rail Conference, itself affiliated with Teamsters Canada.

In late 2005 Canadian Auto Workers Local 110 changed affiliation, becoming Division 105 Locomotive Engineers.

Trade unions in British Columbia
International Brotherhood of Teamsters

Trade unions established in 2006